Stretford Memorial Hospital was a health facility in Seymour Grove, Stretford, Greater Manchester. It was managed by Central Manchester University Hospitals NHS Foundation Trust. The facility closed in 2015.

History
The facility, which was designed in the Italianate style, was built as a private residence known as Basford House and completed in around 1850. It was lent to the British Red Cross for use as an auxiliary hospital during the First World War. A local trust acquired the building and converted into a maternity hospital, as a lasting memorial to soldiers who died in the First World War, in 1925. It joined the National Health Service in 1948 and the pop star, Andy Gibb, was born at the hospital in 1958. It was converted for use as a geriatric hospital in October 1985.

Services transferred to Trafford General Hospital and Stretford Memorial Hospital closed in 2015. After its closure, the site became a target for vandals and squatters. In May 2021, a developer submitted proposals for the restoration of the building to the trust.

References

Hospitals established in 1925
1925 establishments in England
2015 disestablishments in England
Hospitals in Greater Manchester
Defunct hospitals in England
Stretford